The 2016 Sun Belt Conference men's basketball tournament was held at Lakefront Arena in New Orleans, Louisiana from March 10 to March 13. The tournament winner, Little Rock, received an automatic bid into the 2016 NCAA tournament.

Seeds

Schedule

Bracket

References

External links
 2016 Sun Belt Men's Basketball Championship

Sun Belt Conference men's basketball tournament
Tournament
Sun Belt Conference men's basketball tournament
Sun Belt Conference men's basketball tournament